Mel Tormé and the Marty Paich Dek-Tette is a 1956 album by Mel Tormé, with Marty Paich and his Dek-Tette.

Track listing 
 "Lulu's Back in Town" (Al Dubin, Harry Warren) – 3:06
 "When the Sun Comes Out" (Harold Arlen, Ted Koehler) – 3:20
 "I Love to Watch the Moonlight" (Josef Myrow, Bickley Reichmer) – 2:53
 "Fascinating Rhythm" (George Gershwin, Ira Gershwin) – 2:30
 "The Blues" (Duke Ellington) – 3:34
 "Carioca" (Edward Eliscu, Gus Kahn, Vincent Youmans) – 3:18
 "The Lady Is a Tramp" (Lorenz Hart, Richard Rodgers) – 2:54
 "I Like to Recognize the Tune" (Hart, Rodgers) – 3:16
 "Keeping Myself for You" (Sidney Clare, Vincent Youmans) – 3:44
 "Lullaby of Birdland" (George Shearing, George David Weiss) – 4:54
 "When April Comes Again" (Jerry Livingston, Doris Schaefer, Randy Weston) – 2:59
 "Sing for Your Supper" (Hart, Rodgers) – 2:23

Personnel 
 Mel Tormé - vocals
 Marty Paich - arranger, conductor
Pete Candoli - trumpet
Don Fagerquist - trumpet
Bob Enevoldsen - trombone
Bud Shank - alto sax
Bob Cooper - tenor sax
 Jack DuLong - baritone sax
 Vince DeRosa - french horn
 Albert Pollan - tuba
Red Mitchell - bass
Mel Lewis - drums
Jack Montrose - tenor sax
 John Cave - french horn

References 

1955 albums
Mel Tormé albums
Albums arranged by Marty Paich
Bethlehem Records albums
Albums conducted by Marty Paich